Gábor Brlázs (born 20 October 1975) is a Hungarian football coach and a former player.

Club career
Brlázs played for Békéscsabai Előre FC as a defender from 1 July 2006 until 30 June 2009.

References

External links
Organization of Professional Footballers

1975 births
Living people
People from Békéscsaba
Hungarian footballers
Association football defenders
Békéscsaba 1912 Előre footballers
Orosháza FC players
Hungarian football managers
Békéscsaba 1912 Előre managers
Sportspeople from Békés County